Polymorphomyia pilosula is a species of tephritid or fruit flies in the genus Polymorphomyia of the family Tephritidae.

Distribution
Mexico, South East to Costa Rica.

References

Tephritinae
Insects described in 1899
Diptera of North America